Scrobipalpa selectella is a moth in the family Gelechiidae. It was described by Aristide Caradja in 1920. It is found in Tunisia, Greece, Turkey, Uralsk, Ukraine, Kazakhstan, China (Hebei, Inner Mongolia, Ningxia, Tianjin, Xinjiang) and Mongolia.

The ground colour of the forewings is dirty whitish to grey with reduced groups of whitish scales. The hindwings are grey.

The larvae feed on Halostachys belangeriana and Halocnemum strobilaceum.

References

Scrobipalpa
Moths described in 1920